The Cribs is the debut studio album by the British indie rock band The Cribs, released in 2004. It was recorded in 7 days in mid/late 2003 at London's Toe-Rag Studios, a vintage styled 8-track studio in the Hackney area. It was self-produced by the band with Ed Deegan engineering, all except track 9, "Tri'elle", which was culled from the band's original sessions at Fortress Studio with Chicago-based Avant-Garde musician Bobby Conn.
In 2005, this record was awarded the prestigious American Society of Composers, Authors and Publishers (ASCAP) College Award. Previous winners have included Coldplay and Franz Ferdinand.

Background
The band formed in 2001, and for the first few years of their existence, they played small gigs in local venues. After being signed by Wichita Recordings, the band released this album in 2004. It was supposed to be released in 2002 but the band had to wait 18 months for drummer Ross Jarman to turn 18, otherwise they would have to spend money they didn't have to rewrite their recording contract.

The majority of the album was recorded at the Toerag Studios in London, and was recorded and produced by Ed Deegan, although the ninth track on the album, "Tri'Elle", was produced by Bobby Conn and engineered by Gareth Parton at Fortress Studios. Conn also provided backing vocals on the track. The album has a mixture of garage rock and indie rock sounds and features Ryan Jarman on electric guitar and vocals, Gary Jarman on bass guitar and vocals, and Ross Jarman plays the drums. All other instruments on the record are played by the band members.

Reissue
On July 29, 2022, The Cribs released reissues of their first three albums, the main reason for which was because the albums' vinyl editions had been out of print for some time. After regaining the rights and master tapes for the albums through the legal battle that caused the band's inactivity several years prior, they spent 2021 sifting through their archives for bonus material to include on the reissues. All three reissued albums entered the Top Ten of the midweek UK Albums Chart.

Track listing

Charts

References

2004 debut albums
The Cribs albums
Wichita Recordings albums